Barrero may refer to:

People

Emilio Muñoz Barrero (born 1979), Spanish footballer
Hilario Barrero (born 1948), Spanish writer, translator, professor and poet
Jesús Barrero (1958–2016), Mexican actor and voice actor
José Barrero (born 1998), Cuban baseball player
Marco Antonio Barrero (born 1962), Bolivian footballer
Pablo Ruiz Barrero (born 1981), Spanish footballer

Places
 Barrero, Guayanilla, Puerto Rico, a barrio
 Barrero, Rincón, Puerto Rico, a barrio
 Barrero Grande, a former name of Eusebio Ayala, Paraguay